El ángel caído (English title:The fallen angel) is a Mexican telenovela produced by Francisco Burillo for Televisa in 1985.

Rebecca Jones starred as antagonistic protagonist, with Alejandro Camacho and Eduardo Palomo.

Plot
María de los Ángeles Bustamante is known to all his people. The image that people have of it, is classified as a good and honest woman and manners too. However, María de los Ángeles, is actually a bitter and capable person to destroy anyone, just to get enough money to support herself. That's when María de los Ángeles marries a man who inherits, and she kills her wedding night, then collect the heritage.

After this act, María de los Ángeles looking to get more money, and so begins with plans to murder his uncle, who's named in his will as one of the heirs of his fortune. However, that heritage should also share with Toño, his cousin. That's when María de los Ángeles begins to make his life miserable, until finally one day decides to escape Toño and  María de los Ángeles leaves town.

Toño comes to work at companies Roberto Florescano, and there falls in love Avelina, but she is committed to Roberto Florescano. Toño Avelina's daughter discovers that his uncle, and that she would inherit part of their heritage. Toño returns to town with Roberto and Avelina. Roberto falls in love with María de los Ángeles, while the other two try to discover the real María de los Ángeles.

Cast 

Rebecca Jones as María de los Ángeles Bustamante
Alejandro Camacho as Roberto Florescano
Eduardo Palomo as Antonio "Toño" Arvide Quijano
Cristina Peñalver as Avelina Galá
Lorenzo de Rodas as Manuel Alfonso "El Gallo" Maldonado
Enrique Rocha as Álvaro
Fernando Ciangherotti as Ramón Florescano
Aurora Alonso as Felicitas Nava
Maritza Olivares as Remedios Nava
Carlos Andrade as Víctor Manuel Márquez
Blanca Torres as Doña Victoria Estévez de Quijano
Nerina Ferrer as Nieves Galá
Betty Catania as Elvira Márquez
Jaime Lozano as Father Rosales
Claudio Reyes Rubio as Patricio
Ricardo de León as Demetrio
Ángeles Marín as Anita
Paty Thomas as Mercedes
Marcela Camacho as Lucía
Carlos Romano as Javier
Víctor Vera as Lic. Macías
Estela Barona as Rosalba
Blanca Córdoba as Bertha
Luis Couturier as Octavio Barrera/Agustín Arvide
Ricardo De Loera as Sr. Castillo
Luisa Huertas as Lic. Medina
Leticia Calderón 
Daniel Martín  
Claudia Ramírez 
Manola Saavedra

Awards

References

External links

Mexican telenovelas
1985 telenovelas
1985 Mexican television series debuts
1986 Mexican television series endings
Spanish-language telenovelas
Television shows set in Mexico
Televisa telenovelas